Northern Indiana Gas and Electric Company Building, also known as the Roma Building, was a historic office building located at South Bend, St. Joseph County, Indiana. It was built in 1915, and was a three-story, brick building sheathed in pink terra cotta. It featured a projecting cornice with brackets and modillions.

It was listed on the National Register of Historic Places in 1985, and delisted in 2012.

References

Former National Register of Historic Places in Indiana
Office buildings on the National Register of Historic Places in Indiana
Commercial buildings completed in 1915
Buildings and structures in St. Joseph County, Indiana
National Register of Historic Places in St. Joseph County, Indiana